Shift-Work is the 13th album by English rock band the Fall, released through Phonogram Records in 1991. 
The Fall started working on the album in 1990 while touring in support of Extricate. Mark E. Smith sacked guitarist Martin Bramah and keyboardist Marcia Schofield immediately after the Australian leg of the tour, reducing the lineup to four for the first time in band's history. Only one song ("Rose") from the sessions with Bramah and Schofield eventually appeared on the album (non-vinyl versions also included the single "White Lightning", originally recorded by The Big Bopper). Several tracks were released as the Dredger EP in August 1990, including "Life Just Bounces", which would later be re-recorded for Cerebral Caustic. The Fall's first release with a reduced lineup was the single "High Tension Line" in December 1990.

Shift-Work marked, in the opinion of critic Ted Mills, a change in direction for the group, as "repetitious grooves became interspersed with pop song structures." Of the songs on the original track list, several have been noted as being more "introspective" than previous Fall efforts. "Edinburgh Man" for example, in which lead singer Mark E. Smith longs to be in the city of Edinburgh, Scotland, has been described as "surprisingly malice-free" and, in one enthusiastic review, as the best Fall song ever.

The album reached number 17 in the UK charts, a two-place improvement on their previous best, The Frenz Experiment.

The album was re-released by Voiceprint in 2002, adding two additional tracks to the original 14 -rack CD: "Blood Outta Stone" and "Xmas With Simon". This incarnation was also made available in a double-CD set with Voiceprint's edition of Code: Selfish in 2003. It was reissued again in an expanded and remastered form by Universal on 7 May 2007.

Track listing

Original UK LP

Original UK CD and cassette

2007 reissue
Disc One
As per original UK vinyl
Disc Two

Miscellenea

The War Against Intelligence was the original title of the album until the outbreak of the Gulf War convinced Smith to change it to something less controversial. In October 2003, Universal released The War Against Intelligence – The Fontana Years, a collection of Fall songs from the albums Extricate, Shift-Work, Code: Selfish and related singles, even as the United Kingdom was involved in another Persian Gulf war.

Personnel
The Fall
Mark E. Smith – vocals
Craig Scanlon – guitar
Steve Hanley – bass guitar
Simon Wolstencroft – drums, keyboards
Kenny Brady –  fiddle; co-lead vocal on "The Book of Lies"
Additional personnel
Craig Leon – organ, guitar
Cassell Webb – backing vocals
Martin Bramah – guitar on "Rose" and "White Lightning"
Marcia Schofield – flute on "Rose", keyboards on "White Lightning"
Dave Bush – electronics; keyboards on "Arid Al's Dream"
Robert Gordon – bass and keyboards on "Cloud of Black"
Technical
Craig Leon – production; mixing (tracks 2-4, 7, 8, 10-12)
Robert Gordon – production 
Grant Showbiz – production 
Pascal Le Gras – cover art

Notes and references

External links
Lyrics

1991 albums
The Fall (band) albums
Albums produced by Grant Showbiz
Albums produced by Craig Leon
Fontana Records albums